Malvinella buddeae is a species of trilobite which lived in La Paz, Bolivia during the Devonian period.

References

Fossil taxa described in 1991
Calmoniidae